Malcolm Goodwin (born November 28, 1982) is an American actor, known for his role as Clive Babineaux in The CW supernatural comedy-drama series iZombie (2015-2019). 

In 2022, Goodwin portrayed Oscar Finlay in the Amazon Prime Video series Reacher.

Life and career
His love for acting began during his time with the Julia Richman Talent Unlimited Program in New York City.  He later trained at SUNY Purchase College Acting Conservatory, where he earned a bachelor's degree in Theatre Arts and Film.

Goodwin has directed and produced independent commercials, sketches, short films, music videos and public service announcements. In 2011 he appeared in the music video for the song "Party Rock Anthem" by LMFAO.   He has been featured in articles for Interview, L.A. Confidential, King, Vibe, and Venice. Goodwin also had minor roles in various films and TV shows, such as American Gangster, Detroit 1-8-7, Leatherheads, The Longshots, Crazy on the Outside.

In 2015, Goodwin was cast in the main role of Det. Clive Babineaux on The CW television series iZombie.

Filmography

Film and TV Movies

Television

References

External links

1982 births
20th-century American male actors
21st-century American male actors
American male film actors
American male television actors
Living people
People from Brooklyn
State University of New York at Purchase alumni
African-American actors